Ning Cai (born October 1947) is a Chinese electrical engineer. He is faculty at Xidian University. In 2005, he was named Fellow of the Institute of Electrical and Electronics Engineers (IEEE) for "contributions to network coding theory and arbitrarily varying channels".

References 

Fellow Members of the IEEE
Living people
1947 births